Ettin is an English word from the Old English Eoten and cognate to the Old Norse Jötunn, and may refer to:

Bogle (also called Ettin), a survival of the term in Northumbrian folklore referring to a malevolent mythical creature
Ettin (Dungeons & Dragons), a two-headed giant
Ettin, the twisted, mindless remains of the fighters of the Legion in the computer game Hexen: Beyond Heretic
Ettins, a species in the Creatures series of computer games
Ettin, a two-headed monstrous giant found in Ultima game series
Ettins, the name given by the Cimmerians (a Norse-descended people) to the Goa'uld in the TV series Stargate SG-1
Ettin, a two headed giant humanoid character in the Three Thieves graphic novel series

See also
Hind Etin
The Red Ettin